This is a list of common physical constants and variables, and their notations. Note that bold text indicates that the quantity is a vector.

Latin characters

Greek characters

Other characters

See also
 List of letters used in mathematics and science
 Glossary of mathematical symbols
 List of mathematical uses of Latin letters
 Greek letters used in mathematics, science, and engineering
 Physical constant
 Physical quantity
 International System of Units
 ISO 31

References

Common Physics Abbreviations